Modified is the second full-length album by Save Ferris, released in 1999.

The album peaked at No. 136 on the Billboard 200.

Critical reception
Barry Walters, of Rolling Stone, wrote that "even when the band is rocking full throttle, [Monique] Powell sings as if she's belting out the latest Disney ballad." Entertainment Weekly thought that Powell's "bluesy bluster turns the familiar almost feral." 

For AllMusic, William Ruhlmann wrote that "Save Ferris may yet find its own place, but that is more likely to come through touring than through its records."

Track listing
All songs written by Brian Mashburn, except where noted.
 "Turn It Up" (Mashburn, Monique Powell) – 3:03
 "The Only Way To Be" (Mashburn, Powell) – 3:18
 "I'm Not Cryin' For You" – 4:03
 "Your Friend" – 3:42
 "No Love" – 4:48
 "Angry Situation" (Mashburn, Powell) – 3:38
 "What You See Is What You Get" (Mashburn, Powell) – 3:18
 "One More Try" – 1:06
 "Mistaken" (Mashburn, Powell, John Travis, Ed Campwirth)– 3:24
 "Holding On" (Mashburn, Powell) – 3:26
 "Let Me In"  - 6:13
 "Modified (Hidden track)" - 3:47

Personnel
 Monique Powell – Vocals, Keyboards 
 Bill Uechi – Bass 
 Eric Zamora – Alto & Tenor Saxophone 
 Brian Mashburn – Guitar, Vocals 
 T-Bone Willy – Trombone 
 José Castellaños – Trumpet 
 Evan Kilbourne – Drums

References

Save Ferris albums
1999 albums
Epic Records albums